Noor Vidts (born 30 May 1996) is a Belgian athlete competing in the combined events. She won the gold medal in the pentathlon at the 2022 World Indoor Championships. Vidts placed fourth in the heptathlon at the 2020 Tokyo Olympics. She earned silver and bronze for the pentathlon at the 2021 and 2023 European Indoor Championships respectively.

At the 2022 World Indoor Championships held in Belgrade, Serbia, Vidts set a Belgian national pentathlon record, slicing 24 points off Nafissatou Thiam's previous best.

International competitions

Personal bests
 Heptathlon – 6571 pts (Tokyo 2021)
 100 metres hurdles – 13.17 (Tokyo 2021)
 200 metres – 23.70 (+1.5 m/s, Tokyo 2021)
 800 metres – 2:08.50 (Eugene, OR 2022)
 High jump – 1.84 (La Nucia 2019)
 Long jump – 6.40 (+0.5 m/s, Brussels 2022)
 Shot put – 14.43 (Eugene, OR 2022)
 Javelin throw – 41.82 (Munich 2022)
Indoors
 Pentathlon – 4929 pts (Belgrade 2022)
 60 metres hurdles – 8.15 (Belgrade 2022)
 800 metres – 2:08.81 (Belgrade 2022)
 High jump – 1.84 (Antequera 2019)
 Long jump – 6.60 (Belgrade 2022)
 Shot put – 14.22 (Louvain-la-Neuve 2022)
Others
 60 metres indoor – 7.82 (Gent 2018)
 100 metres – 12.14 (+0.6 m/s, Ninove 2017)

References

External links

 

1996 births
Living people
Belgian heptathletes
Universiade bronze medalists for Belgium
Universiade medalists in athletics (track and field)
Medalists at the 2017 Summer Universiade
Athletes (track and field) at the 2020 Summer Olympics
Olympic athletes of Belgium
World Athletics Indoor Championships winners
World Athletics Indoor Championships medalists
People from Vilvoorde
Sportspeople from Flemish Brabant
20th-century Belgian women
21st-century Belgian women